Oxbridge Blues is a 1984 British television series, produced and broadcast in the UK by the BBC. It is an anthology of seven approximately 75-minute television plays by Frederic Raphael, most of which focus on relationships of one kind or another.  Most of the plays except one take place in England; "He'll See You Now" takes place in the U.S., and "Sleeps Six" takes place in England and France. The series was broadcast in the U.S. on A&E in 1986 and on PBS in 1988. In Australia, the series was broadcast on ABC in 1987.

The series won the 1987 CableACE Award for Best Dramatic Series. The eponymous first teleplay in the series, "Oxbridge Blues", was nominated for a BAFTA television award for Best Single Drama, and other individual episodes garnered several other awards and nominations.

The seven plays were adapted by the novelist Frederic Raphael from the short stories from his own collections Sleeps Six and other stories (1979) and Oxbridge Blues and other stories (1980). He described the television series as "mostly kind of chamber pieces – modest dramas about love and sex and honour and marriage". Raphael directed one episode, James Cellan Jones directed four, and Richard Stroud directed two.

In December 1984, the BBC published the seven scripts together in book form, entitled Oxbridge Blues and Other Plays for Television.

Episodes
Each episode of Oxbridge Blues is a separate and unrelated story, with different characters in each.

Main cast
Ian Charleson – Victor Geary ("Oxbridge Blues")
Rosalyn Landor – Wendy ("Oxbridge Blues")
Amanda Redman – Maxine ("Oxbridge Blues")
Michael Elphick – Curly Bonaventura ("Oxbridge Blues")
Malcolm Stoddard – Philip Geary ("Oxbridge Blues"); Michael ("Similar Triangles")
Kate Fahy – Eileen ("Similar Triangles"); Lizzie ("Cheap Day")
Ciaran Madden – Laura ("Cheap Day"); Rachel ("Similar Triangles")
Norman Rodway – Alec ("Cheap Day"); Narrator ("Similar Triangles")
Geoffrey Palmer – Fred ("Cheap Day")
Christopher Good – James ("Cheap Day")
Ben Kingsley – Geoff Craven ("Sleeps Six")
Diane Keen – Sherry Craven ("Sleeps Six")
Jeremy Child – Philip Witham ("Sleeps Six")
Jackie Smith-Wood – Lady Jane Witham ("Sleeps Six")
Susan Sarandon – Natalie ("He'll See You Now")
Barry Dennen – Dr. Stein ("He'll See You Now")
David Suchet – Colin ("The Muse")
Frances Tomelty – Angela Lane ("The Muse")
Carol Royle – Tory ("That Was Tory"); Ellen ("The Muse")
John Bird – Clive ("That Was Tory")
Joanna Lumley – GiGi ("That Was Tory")

Music
The series theme music was composed by Richard Holmes, and sung by the English group Cantabile.

Awards and nominations
 The series won the 1987 CableACE Award for Best Dramatic Series.
 The first episode, "Oxbridge Blues", was nominated for a BAFTA television award for Best Single Drama.
 Susan Sarandon won the 1987 CableACE Award for Best Actress in a Dramatic Series for her performance in the episode "He'll See You Now".
Frederic Raphael won the 1987 CableACE Award for Best Writing a Dramatic Series, for episode "Sleeps Six".
 Ben Kingsley was nominated for a CableACE Award for Best Actor in a Dramatic Series for his performance in the episode "Sleeps Six".

Notes

External links

Oxbridge Blues at TV Guide
Oxbridge Blues at the BFI

BBC television dramas
1980s British drama television series
1984 British television series debuts
1984 British television series endings
CableACE Award winners
English-language television shows